Bethnal Green and Stepney was a parliamentary constituency in east London, which returned one Member of Parliament (MP)  to the House of Commons of the Parliament of the United Kingdom from 1983 until it was abolished for the 1997 general election.

History
The constituency was only ever represented by the former cabinet minister Peter Shore, who held the seat for the Labour Party from its creation in 1983 to its abolition in 1997.

Boundaries 
The constituency was made up of nine electoral wards of the London Borough of Tower Hamlets: Holy Trinity, Redcoat, St Dunstan's, St James', St Katharine's, St Mary's, St Peter's, Spitalfields, and Weavers. It was abolished in 1997, and largely replaced by the larger Bethnal Green and Bow constituency, in line with the Boundary Commission's recommendation that one seat should be lost in the paired boroughs of Tower Hamlets and Newham. 297 electors moved to the new Cities of London and Westminster constituency.

Members of Parliament

Elections

Elections in the 1980s

Elections in the 1990s

See also
List of parliamentary constituencies in London

Notes and references 

Parliamentary constituencies in London (historic)
Constituencies of the Parliament of the United Kingdom established in 1983
Constituencies of the Parliament of the United Kingdom disestablished in 1997
Bethnal Green
Stepney